Timequest is an interactive fiction game released by Legend Entertainment, and written by Bob Bates. The game can be played online at the Internet Archive.

Plot
In the year 2090 AD, the use of time machines (called interkrons) is regulated by officers of the Temporal Corps.  There is a strict prohibition against travel into the past, because of its potentially disastrous effects on the timestream and the catastrophic consequences for current civilization.

Zeke S. Vettenmyer, a Lieutenant in the Temporal Corps, has stolen an interkron, traveled back into the past, and subtly altered historical situations so that the outcomes of these events will be changed.  The world as we know it will be destroyed as the effects of these changes ripple forward towards the present and cause massive disruptions in the timestream.

You are a private in the Temporal Corps.  You have been selected to travel into the past and untangle Vettenmyer's twisted plot.  You must pursue Vettenmyer across 3,000 years of history, going to the times and places that he has visited and reversing the changes that he has made which are currently threatening the future that defines your very existence.

Historical events
As the manual notes, there are ten historical events that Vettenmyer has tampered with.  They are:
The death of Julius Caesar, Rome 44 BC
Attila the Hun's halted attack on Rome 452 AD
The Crowning of Charlemagne, Rome 800
An attempted coup by Yahya the Barmakid, who plotted to overthrow Caliph Harun al-Rashid, Baghdad 800
The signing of the Magna Carta, Dover 1215
The siege of Peking by Genghis Khan 1215
Hernán Cortés conquers the Aztecs, Mexico 1519
Sir Francis Drake visits Queen Elizabeth I, Dover 1588
Napoleon's attack on Egypt, Cairo 1798
The planning of Operation Dynamo, the evacuation of Dunkirk before an attack by Hitler, involving visits to Dover and Rome 1940

Historical figures
Several historical figures make appearances in the game besides the ones listed above.  They include:
King Tut
Moses (as a baby)
Cleopatra
Pope Leo I
King Arthur
Robin Hood
Montezuma
William Shakespeare
Admiral Horatio Nelson
Winston Churchill
Benito Mussolini

Locations
The game features six major locations—Mexico, Dover, Rome, Cairo, Baghdad and Peking—each of which can be visited in various years ranging from 1361 BC to 1940 AD (although Mexico, Cairo and Baghdad cannot be visited in all years).

Famous locations that appear in the game include Lake Texcoco, Teotihuacan, Tenochtitlan, Stonehenge, Runnymede, the Cliffs of Dover, the Circus Maximus, St. Peter's Basilica, the Palazzo Braschi, the Great Pyramids, the Nile River, the Hanging Gardens of Babylon, the Forbidden City and the Great Wall of China. The climax of the game takes place inside the Tower of Babel.

Dates
2090 AD (Time HQ)
1940 AD (Dover, Rome, Peking)
1798 AD (Dover, Rome, Cairo, Baghdad, Peking)
1588 AD (Dover, Rome, Cairo, Baghdad, Peking)
1519 AD (Mexico, Dover, Rome, Cairo, Baghdad, Peking)
1215 AD (Mexico, Dover, Rome, Cairo, Baghdad, Peking)
800 AD (Mexico, Dover, Rome, Cairo, Baghdad, Peking)
452 AD (Mexico, Dover, Rome, Cairo, Baghdad, Peking)
44 BC (Mexico, Dover, Rome, Cairo, Baghdad, Peking)
1361 BC (Mexico, Dover, Rome, Cairo, Baghdad, Peking)

Puzzles
Timequest is an extremely non-linear game in which the player immediately has access to six geographical locations in nine different time periods.  Many of the puzzles can be tackled by picking a particular location and moving forward from the earliest time period (1361 BC).  However, like most adventure games, solving puzzles in one location often relies on the use of items obtained elsewhere.

There are also a series of written clues scattered throughout the game, which require some note taking and some insight in putting the clues together into a message.

The main puzzle in the end of the game involves travelling quickly back and forth through time while interacting with versions of your past and future selves.  This puzzle resembles similar sequences found in Sorcerer, Discworld and Escape from Monkey Island.

References

External links

1990s interactive fiction
1991 video games
DOS games
DOS-only games
Legend Entertainment games
Science fiction video games
Single-player video games
Video games about time travel
Video games developed in the United States